Proctoporus machupicchu, the Machu Picchu Andean lizard, is a species of lizard in the family Gymnophthalmidae. It is endemic to Peru.

References

Proctoporus
Reptiles of Peru
Endemic fauna of Peru
Reptiles described in 2015
Taxa named by Luis Mamani
Taxa named by Noemí Goicoechea
Taxa named by Juan Carlos Chaparro